The ridgetop swiftlet  (Collocalia isonota) is a small bird in the swift family Apodidae. It is endemic to the Philippines.

Its natural habitat is subtropical or tropical moist lowland forests. It was previously considered a subspecies of the glossy swiftlet.

Taxonomy
The ridgetop swiftlet was described by the American ornithologist Harry Oberholser in 1906 as a subspecies of the cave swiftlet with the trinomial name Collocalia linchi isonota. The type locality is the province of Benguet on the island of Luzon in the Philippines. The specific epithet isonota is from the Ancient Greek isos meaning "equal" or "similar" and nōton meaning "back". The ridgetop swiftlet was formerly treated as a subspecies of the glossy swiftlet but was promoted to species status based on the results of a detailed analysis of the swiftlets in the genus Collocalia published in 2017.

There are two subspecies:
 C. i. sumbawae Oberholser, 1906 – northern Luzon, (northern Philippines)
 C. i. bagobo Hachisuka, 1930 – Mindanao, Mindoro, Sulu Archipelago (southern Philippines)

Description
The back and upper surface of the wings are a dark dull blue with a moderate green gloss. The throat and upper breast are dark grey with fine white scalloping merging into larger greyish chevrons over the lower breast and flanks, becoming white over the belly. This species lacks the white spots on the inner webs of the tail feathers that are present in some Collocalia species.

References

ridgetop swiftlet
Endemic birds of the Philippines
ridgetop swiftlet
Taxa named by Harry C. Oberholser